Soraya Jadué (born 5 February 1975, in Valdivia, Chile) is a Chilean rower. She competed in the women's single sculls event at the 2000 Summer Olympics in Sydney, 2004 Summer Olympics in Athens, and the 2008 Summer Olympics in Beijing. She was also the national flag bearer in the 2008 Olympic closing ceremony.

Jadué was honoured by the mayor of Valdivia, Omar Sabat, as she retired from the sport in 2015. She had won the bronze medal at the Pan-American games in Toronto.

References

Chilean female rowers
Rowers at the 2000 Summer Olympics
Rowers at the 2004 Summer Olympics
Rowers at the 2008 Summer Olympics
Olympic rowers of Chile
1975 births
Living people
Pan American Games medalists in rowing
Pan American Games gold medalists for Chile
Pan American Games bronze medalists for Chile
Rowers at the 2003 Pan American Games
Rowers at the 2007 Pan American Games
Rowers at the 2015 Pan American Games
Rowers at the 2019 Pan American Games
Medalists at the 2019 Pan American Games
Medalists at the 2015 Pan American Games
People from Valdivia
21st-century Chilean women